Shipley and Windhill railway station was a railway station in Shipley, West Yorkshire, England between 1875 and 1931.

During the 1860s, two small railway companies were formed to promote suburban railways in Bradford, the Bradford, Eccleshill and Idle Railway and the Idle and Shipley Railway. Their schemes and the companies themselves were taken up by the Great Northern Railway, which built a line looping through the villages to the north-east of Bradford: from Laisterdyke, through Eccleshill, Idle and Thackley to Shipley.

The line was open to goods traffic on 4 May 1874 and to passengers on 18 January 1875.

The terminus of the new line was called Shipley and Windhill Station (According to Dewick, it was first Shipley (Great Northern) and then Shipley Bridge Street) or possibly Shipley East. It was built to the same distinctive pattern as other stations on the line, with a short mitre-roofed tower in the centre.

Passenger service on the line ceased on 2 February 1931, and the passenger station closed, but goods traffic continued on the whole line until October 1964 and as far as Idle until 1968.

The railway line is featured in Simon Ormondroyd's Windhill Tales, based on life in the area in 1964.

The station building survives: in 2005 it is occupied by several local businesses. However, proposals put forward in 2016 are for the building to be demolished to make way for apartments. The site has not been given any heritage designation.

References

 Whitaker, Alan & Brian Myland 1993 Railway Memories No. 4: Bradford Bellcode books.

External links 

 Ticket to Shipley and Windhill railway station

Disused railway stations in Bradford
Former Great Northern Railway stations
Railway stations in Great Britain opened in 1875
Railway stations in Great Britain closed in 1931
Shipley, West Yorkshire